The Atalanta B.C. Youth Sector comprises the Primavera (under-19) team and the academy of Italian professional football club Atalanta B.C. The under-19 squad competes in the Campionato Primavera 1. The club's Primavera side has been champions of Italy four times, having last won the championship in 2019–20. The under-18 side has won the Campionato Allievi Nazionali on four occasions, most recently in the 2015–16 season.

Primavera

Current squad

In bold players already capped with senior team in official matches.

Non-playing staff (under-19 squad)
Director: Flavio Negrini
 Head Coach: Massimo Brambilla
 Fitness Coach: 
 Goalkeeping Coach: Giorgio Frezzolini
 Team Doctor: Marco Cassago
 Physiotherapist: Alfredo Adami

Settore Giovanile

Berretti (under-18 squad)

Non-playing staff (under-18 squad)
Directors: Maurizio De Lorenzo / Amelio Macetti
 Head Coach: Stefano Lorenzi
 Fitness Coach: Andrea Filippelli
 Goalkeeping Coach: Giorgio Frezzolini
 Team Doctor: Fabrizio Caroli
 Physiotherapist: Leonardo Belotti

Youth system
Below the Primavera team (U19), and Berretti (U18), there are six other teams listed on the official website: 
Allievi Nazionali (U17)
Allievi Lega Pro  (U16)
Giovanissimi Nazionali  (U15)
Giovanissimi Regionali A  (U14)
Giovanissimi Regionali B (U13)
Giovanissimi Regionali Femminili

Managerial history
  Valter Bonacina (2012–2017) – Primavera (under-19 coach)
  Massimo Brambilla (2015–2017) – Allievi Nazionali (under-17 coach)
  Massimo Brambilla (2017–2022) – Primavera (under-19 coach)
  Marco Fioretto (2022–present) – Primavera (under-19 coach)

Honours
Campionato Nazionale Primavera
Champions: 1992–93, 1997–98, 2018–19, 2019–20
 Torneo Città di Arco
 2016, 2017
 Campionato Allievi Nazionali
 1991–92, 2001–02, 2004–05, 2015–16
 U-17 Supercoppa Italiana
 2016
 Torneo Internazionale Maggioni-Righi
 2017

Notable former Primavera and youth team players
Many players from Atalanta's Primavera squad go on to have careers in professional football, whether at Atalanta or at other clubs. The following is a list of players who have represented their country at full international level and/or have played regularly at a high level of club football.

 Michele Canini
 Richard Hughes

References

External links
 Official Atalanta B.C. Site
 How Atalanta's academy is shaping the future of Italian football – These Football Times (2017)

Youth
Football academies in Italy
UEFA Youth League teams